Prime Minister Abbott may refer to:
John Abbott, Prime Minister of Canada (1891-92)
Tony Abbott, Prime Minister of Australia (2013-15)